Greatest Hits Vol 3 was a compilation album of hits featuring 14 tracks from 1978 to 1982 by Olivia Newton-John released in 1982 by Festival Records in Australia. The album spent 2 weeks at the top of the Australian album charts in 1983.

Track listing

"Heart Attack"
"Magic"
"Physical"
"Deeper Than the Night"
"Hopelessly Devoted To You"
"Make A Move On Me"
"Landslide"
"A Little More Love"
"You're The One That I Want" - (with John Travolta)
"Tied Up"
"Suddenly" - (with Cliff Richard)
"Totally Hot"
"The Promise"
"Xanadu" - (with Electric Light Orchestra)

Charts

1982 greatest hits albums
Olivia Newton-John compilation albums